Takam (Azerbaijani: تکم for "my billy goat") is the name of the king of goats, a male goat, in the folklore of Azarbaijan, Iran. Takam's effigies are made out of wood and ornamented with coloured glass beads and cock's tail feathers. A pole affixed to a Takam is passed through a hole in a plank which is held horizontally, from below which the Takam is moved as though it is dancing on the surface of the plank. While doing so, the person playing the Takam, who is referred to as Takam-Chi (تکم چی), or Takam Gardān (meaning, the one who turns around the Takam), chants special poetry which in Azari is called Sāyā (سایا). The tradition of playing the Takam is millennia old and invariably in all Sāyās reference is made to natural landscapes, pastures and the native domestic animals. At present, the tradition of playing the Takam is strongest in Ardebil. Takams were originally played as messengers bearing the tiding of the arrival of the Spring. In modern times, Takams are also played in connection with a variety of other special festive events. It is conceivable that Takam and Pan, the Greek god of shepherds and flocks, may have a common historical origin.

Notes

References
 The Anthropological Museum of the Tribes of Azarbaijan, Sarāb: English, Persian.

External links
Teke and its meanings
Tekem lyrics in Azerbaijani

Iranian folklore
Mythological caprids
Azerbaijani folklore
Iranian legendary creatures
Turkic legendary creatures
Nowruz